Anaku (アナク) is a kata derived from Ananku (See Karate kata). It is translated as Expression Pivoting Form or Pivoting Swallow Form.  This kata is typically taught to Go Kyu (Green Belt Kata).

Anaku is used to teach two principles: shifting from Kiba Dachi to Zenkutsu Dachi to Kiba Dachi, and T'ung Gee Hsing's principle of pounding, which is hitting the same spot multiple times.

Chotoku Kyan is credited with recomposing this kata for Karate in 1895.

Bunkai
Hsing-Yi's principle is used four times in the kata.  The first time it is two tate zukis (vertical punch).  The second time it is used with two tate zuki's, a mae geri, and another tate zuki.  The name comes from Xingyiquan five element principles, and T'ung Gee Hsing, a known practitioner of Xingyiquan who taught Robert Trias some Xing Yi Quan
There is a third principle that is no longer really taught, though it is used in universal bunkai.  The principle is called a Mae Choi Yaku, which is used instead of stepping back, the uke jumps in place while punching with a vertical punch.
At the end of the kata, one can do a hidden spiritual movement called Shin Shin Taisha.  A Shin Shin Taisha or 'dead breath' is done by exhaling for fifteen seconds straight.  At the end of the Shin Shin Taisha the body should vibrate from stored tension.  This technique used since the body is hard during the 7–13 second range and can take much damage (such as getting hit with Bo's).

References

Karate kata